Cass Street is a station on the River Line light rail system, located on Cass Street at Route 129 in Trenton, New Jersey. It is very nearly directly across Route 129 from New Jersey State Prison. Trenton Thunder Ballpark is located five blocks away down Cass Street, while both the Hamilton Avenue stop and CURE Insurance Arena are located a few blocks north on Route 129.

Southbound service from the station is available to the various stops along the New Jersey side of the Delaware River, terminating in Camden. Northbound service is available to the Trenton Transit Center.

The station opened on March 15, 2004, and is the southwesternmost River Line station in Trenton.

References

External links

 Station from Cass Street from Google Maps Street View

River Line stations
Buildings and structures in Trenton, New Jersey
Railway stations in Mercer County, New Jersey
Railway stations in the United States opened in 2004
2004 establishments in New Jersey